Parachronistis geniculella is a moth of the family Gelechiidae. It is found in Korea.

The wingspan is 10-11.5 mm. The forewings are white with scattered brown and dark brown scales and an apical dot fused with the medial spot. The hindwings are grey.

References

Moths described in 1989
Parachronistis